Mawchi is a Bhil language of India.

References

Languages of India
Languages of Gujarat
Bhil